Saint-Aubin-sur-Mer (literally Saint-Aubin on Sea) is a commune in the Seine-Maritime department in the Normandy region in northern France.

Geography
Here, huge chalk cliffs overlook a pebble beach and the English Channel.

Population

Places of interest
 A Louis XIII style château, built on the old castle, with a dovecote and park.
 A seventeenth-century fortified manorhouse.
 Vestiges of the Atlantic Wall.
 The church of St. Aubin, dating from the twelfth century.

See also
Communes of the Seine-Maritime department

References

External links

Saint-Aubin-sur-Mer Official website 

Communes of Seine-Maritime
Populated coastal places in France